Puech is a French surname. Notable people with the surname include:

Denys Puech (1854–1942), French sculptor
Émile Puech (born 1941), French biblical scholar
Henri-Charles Puech (1902–1986), French historian
Jean Puech (born 1942), French politician
Jean-Baptiste Puech, French actor
Louis Puech (1852–1947), French politician
Marie-Louise Puech-Milhau (1876-1966), French pacifist, feminist and journal editor
Nicolas Puech (born 1943), French billionaire

See also
Le Puech, a French commune
Musée Denys-Puech, a French art gallery

French-language surnames